Tajanjar may refer to:
 Tajanjar-e Olya
 Tajanjar-e Sofla